Joe Breytenbach (born 17 November 1983) is a South African rugby union player.

References

South African rugby union players
Living people
1983 births
Rugby union wings
Rugby union players from Limpopo
SWD Eagles players
Eastern Province Elephants players